Boron phosphide (BP) (also referred to as boron monophosphide, to distinguish it from boron subphosphide, B12P2) is a chemical compound of boron and phosphorus. It is a semiconductor.

History
Crystals of boron phosphide were synthesized by Henri Moissan as early as 1891.

Appearance
Pure BP is almost transparent, n-type crystals are orange-red whereas p-type ones are dark red.

Chemical properties
BP is not attacked by acids or boiling aqueous alkali water solutions. It is only attacked by molten alkalis.

Physical properties
BP is known to be chemically inert and exhibit very high thermal conductivity. Some properties of BP are listed below:
lattice constant 0.45383 nm
coefficient of thermal expansion 3.65 /°C (400 K)
heat capacity CP ~ 0.8 J/(g·K) (300 K)
Debye temperature = 985 K
Bulk modulus 152 GPa
relatively high microhardness of 32 GPa (100 g load).
electron and hole mobilities of a few hundred cm2/(V·s) (up to 500 for holes at 300 K)
high thermal conductivity of ~ 460 W/mK at room temperature

See also
 Boron arsenide
 Boron nitride
 Aluminium phosphide
 Gallium phosphide

References

Further reading
 
 
 

Boron compounds
Phosphides
III-V semiconductors
III-V compounds
Zincblende crystal structure